The ZooParc de Beauval, more commonly called Beauval Zoo or, more simply, Beauval, is a French zoological park located in Saint-Aignan-sur-Cher, Centre-Val de Loire. It features more than 35,000 animals on 40 hectares, which is one of the largest animal collections in France and in Europe. Created in 1980 by Françoise Delord, it is now run by her son, Rodolphe Delord, and managed by his family, which owns most of the capital.

Beauval was often the first zoo to have some animals in France, which contributed to its reputation and to its development. It has been the first zoo in France to present leucistic big cats, white tigers and white lions, in the 1990s. Still today, many species are rare in France, such as the okapi and the tree kangaroos, or unique, such as the koala and the giant panda.

Four greenhouses present birds, great apes, sloths, reptiles, manatees and Australasian animals, while three plains present herbivores of the African savannah (like giraffes, white rhinos and antelope), African elephants and Asian herbivores (such as Indian rhinos and Malayan tapirs). Other facilities in the park are the Chinese zone called "On China Heights", the African swamp called "The Hippos' Reserve", the sea lion basin presenting "The Sea Lions' Odyssey" and the outdoor theatre presenting a free-flight bird show entitled "Masters of Airs".

As a permanent member of the European Association of Zoos and Aquaria, it joined ex situ conservation by participating in European Endangered Species Programme (EEP), which it coordinates three of them. It also supports in situ conservation associations working in the field through its dedicated association, Beauval Nature, and has reintroduced several animals in Africa.

The ZooParc de Beauval also proposes a consistent hotel offers with three accommodation facilities: an apartment hotel, Les Hameaux de Beauval, and two three-star hotels: Les Jardins de Beauval Balinese inspired and Les Pagodes de Beauval in Chinese style.

With more than 1,600,000 annual visitors since 2019, it is the most visited touristic site of the Centre-Val de Loire region, one of the five most visited zoological institutions in France and the most visited conventional private zoo in the country. In 2019, the ZooParc de Beauval had 600 permanent employees. In 2019, it had a revenue of 66 million euros and a net income of 4.47 million euros.

History

1970s and 1980s
In the early 1970s, Françoise Lajunias Dite Delord (1940–2021), a former student at the Paris Conservatory of Dramatic Art and presenter of performances at the Bobino music hall, received as a gift - at the Salon de l'Enfance, with a subscription to a children's newspaper - a pair of African silverbill, a species of African passerine. Shortly after, having acquired for them a bird cage on the Quai de la Mégisserie where she clicked, she returned there to get two grey Zebra finch, then two white. Its collection of birds grows to reach four hundred individuals. In 1980, faced with the impossibility of housing them all in Paris, she moved with her husband, the conjurer Jacques Delord, and their two children, Delphine and Rodolphe, to Saint-Aignan-sur-Cher, where she opened a bird park in a place called Beauval, on either side of a small tributary of the Cher, le Traine-Feuilles. Some 1,500 then 2,000 birds are present in the aviaries of Beauval. In 1989, Beauval became a zoological park by welcoming its first mammals, big cats and primates.

1990s

In 1990, the ZooParc welcomed its first lions.

In 1991, Beauval presented his first white tigers, Gorby and Raïssa, purchased for $100,000 from Robert Baudy, owner of the Rare Feline Breeding Center, a wildcat breeding based in Center Hill, Florida, in the United States. They are supposedly of the Siberian tiger subspecies, with some hybridization, probably of the Bengal tiger subspecies. Although they are not the first white tigers to be presented in Europe, they are unique in France at the time of their arrival in Beauval, which will make the zoo known and attract many visitors. In that year, the number of admissions went from 70,000 to 150,000.

In 1992, the zoo opened its first greenhouse, the tropical greenhouse for great apes. There are installed two groups of hominoids, Bornean orangutans and chimpanzees, with two outer islands of 1,100 m2 and 1,300 m2 respectively. Françoise Delord acquired that year a female chimpanzee from a circus, for 10,000 francs.

In 1993, a vivarium was opened in the greenhouse of the great apes and received around a hundred snakes and Nile crocodiles, observable underwater thanks to a large aqua-terrarium.

In 1994, the second greenhouse of the park was opened, the tropical bird greenhouse, with a surface area of 2,000 m2, where 300 exotic birds were installed, living in a plant setting.

In 1995, a sea lion swimming pool was built and the park gave its first show combining free flight raptors and sea lions.

In 1996, a nursery, intended for the breeding of young animals, was created. The zoo welcomed Asian otters, red pandas and raccoons whose enclosures are decorated with tackle and underwater viewing pools.

In 1997, the park opened a third tropical greenhouse in which gorillas and manatees take place.

In 1998, two new structures welcomed hyenas and African wild dogs.

In 1999, the park welcomed a couple of white lions and created an African plain in which 80 animals of several species are presented, including springbok, sable antelope, blue wildebeest, Grévy's zebras, giraffes, ostriches, Egyptian goose or marabouts. One of the giraffes, the male Joseph, is imported from the Marwell Zoo in England, while lechwes come from the Czech Republic.
The two white lions bought that year by the park, Makalali and Makwalo, come from a farm in Timbavati, South Africa, but the name of the farm and the price will remain secret. Like the purchase of the white tigers in 1991, this acquisition has no zoological interest but confers a commercial advantage to the zoo, because although Makalali and Makwalo are not the first white lions to be presented in Europe but they are unique in France at the time of their arrival in Beauval.

2000s

In 2000, three white rhinos joined the African Savannah.

In 2001, a nursery was created for the hand-raising of baby parrots.

In 2002, an Australian greenhouse was created and a couple of koalas, tree-kangaroos and a marine aquarium were installed there. In addition, the mini-farm, hitherto located at the entrance of the park, is moving and growing.

In 2003, the zoo expanded by five hectares to accommodate a group of five African elephants. They benefit from 0.5 hectares of sandy park, 0.9 hectares of grassy park, a four-meter deep basin that completely immerses them and a building of over 1,500 m2.

In 2004, the vivarium was renovated in an area of 400 m2, which is occupied by more than 250 reptiles: snakes, turtles, crocodiles, iguanas, etc. The park receives a three-year-old white tiger, Chile, from the Parken Zoo in Eskilstuna, Sweden.

In 2005, okapis arrived in the park; for five years, the ZooParc will be the only zoological park in France to present this species. The park also receives a two-year-old male white tiger, Sherkan, born at Touroparc zoo. With Chile, he forms the second breeding pair of Beauval white tigers, replacing Gorby and Raïssa, then at the end of their life.

In 2006, the zoo welcomed Somali wild ass, East Javan langur and Clouded leopard and a piranha pool was created in the gorilla and manatee greenhouse.

In 2007, a pool for Humboldt penguins was created, with a size of 600 m³ with a tree-lined beach of 400 m2, and a South American pampa. Giant anteaters arrive in the park.

In 2008, a first hotel structure was created. This is a 3-star hotel, Les Jardins de Beauval, about 1 km from the zoo entrance. Giant anteaters and Sumatran tigers, the first non-leukic tigers to be welcomed in Beauval, are installed in the park and a new aquarium is built, the coral reef.

In 2009, a female koala named Alkoomie and a male white rhino named Kanty were born. The ZooParc created the Beauval Nature association and the park also enlarges the area of spotted hyenas.

2010s
In 2010, a 1.5-hectare Asian plain was created, with Malayan tapirs, Indian rhinoceros, muntjacs, white-naped cranes, chitals, blackbucks, nilgais and fishing cats installed there. A second koala, baptized Joey, was also born.

In 2011, a new area of almost three hectares called "Sur les hauteurs de Chine" opens, with takins, snow leopards, red pandas, northern plains gray langurs and Steller's sea eagles. In February, a female Indian rhinoceros arrives in the park. A pair of Sumatran tigers and a female manatee are then welcomed in March. A white rhino and a sixth gorilla was born.

Animal overview

La Savane Africaine
The African Savannah habitat is home to a large collection of African animals roaming together. Separated from the visitors by gravel ditches, thirteen species of animals live together here, including giraffes, white rhinoceroses, Grevy's zebras, wildebeest, ostriches, Egyptian geese, springbok, lechwe and reedbuck.

Australian House
The Australian House is one of the few places in Europe where koalas and Goodfellow's tree-kangaroos can be seen. There is also an aquarium, home to 1,500 species of fish from Australia's Great Barrier Reef. There are also timid rat-kangaroos, and kookaburras. In nearby outdoor enclosures, there are red kangaroos, both in large enclosures.

Manatee Basin 
The Manatee Basin is a habitat for a family of West Indian manatees, and ZooParc de Beauval has one of the most successful breeding herds in Europe. The manatee tank is 26 degrees, 1,000 cubic meters of water and two meters of glass around part of the tank. As well as manatees, the pool hosts Amazonian fish and river turtles. Each manatee consumes up to 50 kg of vegetation per day, preferring to eat lettuce, celery and carrots. The first baby manatee is called Sylvester and was born on December 31, 2001, and was later followed in 2003 by the world's first captive-born manatee twins.

Serre Tropicale des Grands Singes 
This house was made to provide shelter for some of the parks many primates. Some of the primate species present include the troop of chimpanzees and the orangutan (which live alongside gibbon families). Both species of primate live on large outdoor islands that can be viewed easily, and each group of primates have 400 meters of ground to explore. At the beginning of this house is a vivarium, home to one hundred snakes, as well as turtles and American alligator that can be observed underwater. At the far end of the house is an area devoted to small primates, with emperor tamarin, and pygmy marmoset.

Gorilla complex
Leading on from the Bassin le Lamantins, the Gorilla Complex is a huge 11-meter-tall greenhouse, home to free-flying ducks and birds such as toucans. There is a lagoon home to rays, and a large indoor habitat for a family of gorilla, with a huge 9-meter space to allow the gorillas to climb. The gorillas also have access to a large outdoor island.

Big cats
The big cat list in this complex is extensive, and the species list includes:
Sumatran tiger
Jaguar (including a black specimen)
Pumas
White tiger
white lion
Persian leopard

There are also spotted hyenas near the big cat complex.

Smaller animals
A collection of four smaller enclosures near the Gorilla Complex is home to four different species, which are the groups of otters, red pandas, raccoon and Barbary macaques.

Show
The show features a family of Californian sea lion, as well as performing parrots and birds of prey. There are nine adult sea lions and their four babies, and all were born in Beauval.

La Reserve Des Hippopotames
Opened in 2016, this exhibit is extensive, home to a small pod of hippopotamus, as well as a herd of nyala and red river hog. The exhibit is complemented by massive baobab trees and a metal net, spanning the entire enclosure. This is because the exhibit also houses many African birds such as hamerkop and Eurasian spoonbill.

Le Dôme Equatorial
Opened in 2020, this exhibit is Beauval's latest development. It holds around 200 different species underneath 1 hectare and 38 metre-tall dome. It lets in sunlight through a glass roof and it constantly heated to a temperature of 26 °C. Stars of the exhibit include the Pygmy hippopotamus, the Giant otter, the Harpy eagle and many more species. Soon to arrive at the dome is the Red-shanked douc langur, a species only found in one zoo in Europe and nowhere in North America.

Notes

External links 

Zoos in France
Buildings and structures in Loir-et-Cher
Organizations based in Centre-Val de Loire
Tourist attractions in Loir-et-Cher
Zoos established in 1980
1980 establishments in France